L'Hôpital-Saint-Blaise is a commune in the Pyrénées-Atlantiques département in south-western France.

It is located in the historical province of Soule.

Sights
The 12th-century Romanesque church of L'Hôpital-Saint-Blaise has been listed as a UNESCO World Heritage Site as part of the World Heritage Sites of the Routes of Santiago de Compostela in France.

See also
Communes of the Pyrénées-Atlantiques department

References

Communes of Pyrénées-Atlantiques
World Heritage Sites in France
Pyrénées-Atlantiques communes articles needing translation from French Wikipedia